Second-seeded Andrés Gómez defeated Thierry Tulasne in the final to claim his second U.S. Clay Courts title and $51,000 prize money.

Seeds
The top eight seeds received a bye into the second round. A champion seed is indicated in bold text while text in italics indicates the round in which that seed was eliminated.

  Thierry Tulasne (final)
  Andrés Gómez (champion)
  Jimmy Arias (semifinals)
  Martín Jaite (semifinals)
  Henrik Sundström (third round)
  Paul McNamee (third round)
  Tim Wilkison (third round)
  Mikael Pernfors (quarterfinals)
  Milan Šrejber (first round)
  Guillermo Vilas (third round)
  Jakob Hlasek (quarterfinals)
  Aaron Krickstein (quarterfinals)
  Robert Seguso (first round)
  Jonathan Canter (first round)
  Brian Teacher (third round)
  Glenn Michibata (first round)

Draw

Finals

Top half

Section 1

Section 2

Bottom half

Section 3

Section 4

References

External links

1986 Grand Prix (tennis)
Men's Singles